Legislative Assembly elections were held in the Indian state of Punjab in 1977. The result was a victory for Shiromani Akali Dal, which won 58 of the 117 seats.

Result

Constituency wise Results

Bypolls

References 

State Assembly elections in Punjab, India
1970s in Punjab, India
Punjab